All Saints Church, Deganwy, is an Anglican church in the town of Deganwy, Wales, on a site overlooking the Conwy estuary.

Description
It is an active Anglican church in the benefice of Eglwysrhos (or Llanrhos), the deanery of Llanrwst, the archdeaconry of St Asaph, and the diocese of St Asaph. It is designed by Cadw as a Grade II* listed building.

The church was built as a memorial church by Lady Augusta Mostyn to a design by John Douglas of Chester on a site overlooking the Conwy estuary. It has a clerestory, a chancel higher than the nave, and a west tower.

Organ
The two-manual organ was built by Alex Young and Sons of Manchester in 1899, and it was modified by L. Reeves in 1972.
.

See also
List of new churches by John Douglas

References

Grade II* listed churches in Conwy County Borough
Gothic Revival church buildings in Wales
19th-century Church in Wales church buildings
Deganwy
John Douglas buildings
Churches completed in 1899